Winter & the Wolves is the fourth studio album by American hip hop artist Grieves. It was released on Rhymesayers Entertainment in 2014. It peaked at number 57 on the Billboard 200 chart.

Critical reception
At Metacritic, which assigns a weighted average score out of 100 to reviews from mainstream critics, Winter & the Wolves received an average score of 58% based on 4 reviews, indicating "mixed or average reviews".

Track listing

Charts

References

External links
 

2014 albums
Rhymesayers Entertainment albums
Hip hop albums by American artists